During the 1996–97 English football season, Peterborough United F.C. competed in the Football League Second Division.

Season summary
In the 1996–97 season, Peterborough appointed Barry Fry as manager and chairman just after leaving Birmingham at the end of last season. His first season in charge wasn't great and Peterborough were relegated to the Third Division.

Final league table

Results
Peterborough United's score comes first

Legend

Football League Second Division

FA Cup

League Cup

Football League Trophy

Squad

References

Peterborough United F.C. seasons
Peterborough United